Obithome is a genus of moth in the family Cosmopterigidae. It contains only one species, Obithome punctiferella, which is found in North America, where it has been recorded from Texas.

The wingspan is 10–11 mm. The forewings are dark silvery grey, evenly speckled with numerous minute tufts of black scales. The hindwings are dark fuscous. Adults have been recorded on wing in January.

References

Natural History Museum Lepidoptera genus database

Chrysopeleiinae
Monotypic moth genera